Gentille Alouette is a 1990 French-Chilean film written and directed by Sergio Castillo. Geraldine Chaplin stars as an actress in Paris that is stalked by a Latin American colonel played by Héctor Alterio.

Plot
The Colonel (Alterio) begins to stalk his former lover, Angela (Chaplin), as he suspects her of being involved in an anti-government group. Surrealist elements come into play as the Colonel blends his memories of Angela with his suspicions to create fantastical scenarios of capturing the elusive actress.

Cast
Héctor Alterio as the Colonel
Geraldine Chaplin as Angela Duverger
John Leguizamo as Ortiz

Reception
The New York Times described the film as "intriguing", and that Castilla "combines surrealism and high comedy in a visionary style that with its echoes of Gabriel García Márquez and Luis Buñuel seems quintessentially Latin American in spirit."

References

External links
 

1990 films
Chilean drama films
French drama films
Films set in Paris
1990s Spanish-language films
1990s French films